Mikael Rosén (born Mikael Gustavsson on August 15, 1974) is a former Swedish football player.

Career

Started his career in Motala AIF in 1992, he then moved in 1997 to Halmstads BK and played with the club until 2000, during this time he gained 1 medal every season of different values, in 2001 he signed for the rival team Helsingborgs IF, in 2003 he was offered an extension of his contract with Helsingborg, Allsvenska rival AIK also showed interest in signing him, he however signed a 2-year contract with Danish team Viborg FF, in 2005 he agreed on a one-year extension of his contract with Viborg, he however did not complete the contract as he during the summer of 2006 signed for his old club Halmstads BK.

He stayed with Halmstad for another six seasons. After the relegation to Superettan his contract expired and he left the club.

He has been given the nickname Gus after his second name which he was born with.

Achievements

 Halmstads BK:

 Allsvenskan:
 Champion: 1997, 2000
 Lilla silvret (3rd): 1999
 Bronze: 1998

 Helsingborgs IF:

 Allsvenskan:
 Bronze: 2002

References

External links
  
 
 

1987 births
Living people
Swedish footballers
Association football defenders
Allsvenskan players
Sweden international footballers
Halmstads BK players
Helsingborgs IF players
Viborg FF players
Expatriate men's footballers in Denmark